Urbadutta Pant is a Nepalese politician, a Central Committee member of the Communist Party of Nepal (Unified Marxist-Leninist). He was elected to the Pratinidhi Sabha in the 1994 election.

He later became a member of the Rashtriya Sabha (Upper House of Parliament). In 2004 he was named State Minister for Labour and Transport Management in the cabinet of Sher Bahadur Deuba, when the CPN(UML) joined that government. Pant was appointed as a Member of Parliament, when the interim legislature was formed in January 2007.

References

Government ministers of Nepal
Living people
Communist Party of Nepal (Unified Marxist–Leninist) politicians
Members of the National Assembly (Nepal)
Year of birth missing (living people)
Nepal MPs 1994–1999